Shwe Ohn (1923-2010) was an ethnic Shan politician and co-founder of the Union Democratic Party, which contested the 2010 Burmese general election. He participated in the Panglong Conference and was an advocate for federalism in Burma.

In his final years, he began working on an autobiography, in spite of being diagnosed with liver cancer. The book, entitled Union Traveler, was published in May 2011.

He died from complications of liver cancer at his home in Yangon's Sanchaung Township on 20 August 2010. He was buried at Yayway Cemetery in Yangon.

References

Burmese politicians
People from Shan State
1923 births
2010 deaths
Burmese people of Shan descent
Deaths from liver cancer